The 2021 season was the New York Jets' 52nd season in the National Football League, their 62nd overall, their third under general manager Joe Douglas and their first under head coach Robert Saleh. 

The Jets improved on their 2–14 record from the previous season. Despite this, they were eliminated from playoff contention for the eleventh consecutive season in Week 14. The Jets missed the playoffs for the eleventh straight season, tying a record set between 1970–1980.

Roster changes

Free agents

Unrestricted

Restricted

Exclusive Rights

Signings

Releases

Draft

Staff
 Pass Game Specialist Greg Knapp was slated to be the team's pass game specialist, but he died on July 22 due to vehicular manslaughter.

Final roster

Preseason

Regular season

Schedule

Note: Intra-division opponents are in bold text.

Game summaries

Week 1: at Carolina Panthers

Former Jets quarterback Sam Darnold, traded to Carolina prior to the season, led the Panthers to an early lead over his former team, scoring two touchdowns including a 57-yard pass to former Jets teammate Robby Anderson. Two late touchdown passes by Jets rookie quarterback Zach Wilson were not enough for New York to come back and win. For the third straight year, the Jets started the season 0–1. Tackle Mekhi Becton also suffered a knee injury during the game, and would later be put on injured reserve after opting for surgery.

Week 2: vs. New England Patriots

In a battle between rookie quarterbacks, Zach Wilson threw four interceptions to the Patriots defense while Patriots quarterback Mac Jones had a quietly efficient performance, completing over 70% of his passes. With their 11th straight loss to the Patriots, the Jets fell to 0–2.

Week 3: at Denver Broncos

Week 4: vs. Tennessee Titans

Despite a slow start, Wilson passed for two touchdowns and led the Jets offense to a go-ahead field goal in overtime. The Titans missed a potential game-tying field goal on the second drive of overtime, allowing New York to win its first game of the season.

Week 5: at Atlanta Falcons
NFL London games

Week 7: at New England Patriots

Week 8: vs. Cincinnati Bengals

With the upset win, the Jets matched their 2-win total from the previous year. Quarterback Mike White, whom made his first career start in place of an injured Zach Wilson, became the first quarterback since Cam Newton to throw for 400+ yards in their first career start, and the first Jets quarterback to throw 400+ yards since Vinny Testaverde in 2000.

Week 9: at Indianapolis Colts

Despite the loss, the Jets were given the minor comfort of participating in a game that made a scorigami — a 45–30 game had never happened before in NFL history.

Week 10: vs. Buffalo Bills

Week 11: vs. Miami Dolphins

Week 12: at Houston Texans

Week 13: vs. Philadelphia Eagles

The Jets dropped to 0–12 all time against the Eagles.

Week 14: vs. New Orleans Saints

Week 15: at Miami Dolphins

Week 16: vs. Jacksonville Jaguars

Week 17: vs. Tampa Bay Buccaneers

Week 18: at Buffalo Bills

For the second straight season, the Jets failed to win a divisional game.

Standings

Division

Conference

References

External links
 

New York Jets
New York Jets seasons
New York Jets season
21st century in East Rutherford, New Jersey
Meadowlands Sports Complex